Kuhlan Ash Sharaf District is a district of the Hajjah Governorate, Yemen. As of 2003, the district had a population of 44,760 people.

The district is under control of the Shi'a militant group, the Houthis, since November 2011.

References

Districts of Hajjah Governorate